Phil Johnston may refer to:

 Phil Johnston (filmmaker) (born 1971)
 Phil Johnston (footballer) (born 1990)
 Philip W. Johnston (born 1944)